Randy Walker may refer to:
 Randy Walker (punter) (born 1951), American football punter, played for Green Bay Packers in 1974
 Randy Walker (American football coach) (1954–2006), American football player and coach, head coach at Miami University, 1990–1998, and Northwestern University, 1999–2005
 Stretch (rapper) (1968–1995), American rapper, born Randy Walker

See also
 John Randall Walker (1874–1942), U.S. political figure